Jiujiang District is a district of the city of Wuhu, Anhui Province, China.

Administrative divisions
Jiujiang District is divided to 5 subdistricts and 1 other.
5 Subdistricts

1 Other
 Jiujiang Economic and Technological Development Zone

Transportation 
The district is served by Wuhu North railway station.

References

Wuhu